Pernell Whitaker Sr. (January 2, 1964 – July 14, 2019) was an American professional boxer who competed from 1984 to 2001, and subsequently worked as a boxing trainer. He was a four-weight world champion, having won titles at lightweight, light welterweight, welterweight, and light middleweight; the undisputed lightweight title; and the lineal lightweight and welterweight titles. In 1989, Whitaker was named Fighter of the Year by The Ring magazine and the Boxing Writers Association of America. He currently holds the longest unified lightweight championship reign in boxing history at six title defenses. Whitaker is generally regarded as one of the greatest defensive boxers of all-time.

As an amateur, Whitaker won a silver medal in the lightweight division at the 1982 World Championships, followed by gold at the 1983 Pan American Games and 1984 Olympics. After his retirement in 2001, Whitaker returned to the sport as a trainer. In 2002, The Ring ranked him tenth in their list of "The 100 Greatest Fighters of the Last 80 Years". In 2006, Whitaker was inducted into the International Boxing Hall of Fame, in his first year of eligibility.

Amateur career
Whitaker had an extensive amateur boxing career, having started at the age of nine. He had 214 amateur fights, winning 201, 91 of them by knockouts, though he said that he had up to 500 amateur fights. He lost to two-time Olympic Gold medalist Ángel Herrera Vera at the final of the World Championships 1982 but beat him four other times, notably in the final of the Pan American Games 1983 in Caracas. He crowned his amateur career with an Olympic gold medal in 1984, beating Luis Ortiz to obtain it.

Professional career

Lightweight
In just his eleventh and twelfth pro bouts, Whitaker defeated former world champion Alfredo Layne on December 20, 1986 and former WBA and lineal Super Featherweight and WBC Light Welterweight title holder Roger Mayweather on March 28, 1987. Whitaker won both bouts before hometown crowds at the Norfolk Scope, less than a mile from where he lived as a child in a Norfolk housing project. Whitaker would fight nine times in the Scope arena during his career.

On March 12, 1988, he challenged José Luis Ramírez for the WBC Lightweight title in Levallois, France. He suffered his first pro defeat when the judges awarded a split decision to Ramirez. This was a highly controversial decision (considered one of the worst ever by many analysts), as most boxing observers felt that Whitaker easily won.

Undisputed lightweight champion
Whitaker trudged on, winning a decision over Greg Haugen for the IBF Lightweight title on February 18, 1989, becoming the first boxer to knock Haugen down by sending him to the mat in the sixth round. He then added the vacant WBC & The Ring belts by avenging his loss to Ramirez on August 20.

Now a champion, Whitaker proceeded to dominate boxing's middle divisions over the first half of the 1990s. In 1990, he defended his Lightweight title against future champion Freddie Pendleton and Super Featherweight Champion Azumah Nelson of Ghana. On August 11, 1990, he knocked out Juan Nazario in one round to win the WBA and vacant lineal lightweight titles, becoming the first Undisputed Lightweight Champion since Roberto Durán. His highlight of 1991 was a win over Jorge Páez and a fight against European Champion Poli Díaz that ended in another win.

IBF light welterweight champion
In 1992, he began his ascent in weight, winning the IBF light welterweight title from Colombian puncher Rafael Pineda on July 18.

WBC and lineal welterweight champion

On March 6, 1993, he decisioned Buddy McGirt to become the Lineal and WBC Welterweight Champion.

Whitaker vs. Chávez

Whitaker was gaining momentum and boxing experts and fans felt that he needed to win against the pound for pound best boxer in the world: Julio César Chávez. The two met in a welterweight superfight simply named "The Fight" on September 10, 1993 in San Antonio, Texas. In the eyes of many of the spectators, Whitaker outboxed the Mexican legend. While one judge did score the fight in favor of Whitaker (115-113), the other 2 judges saw an even bout (115-115), resulting in a majority draw. Sports Illustrated 's post-fight edition had "ROBBED!" across the cover and they believed that Whitaker had won no less than 9 of the 12 rounds in the fight. The now-defuncted “Bert Sugar's Boxing Illustrated" magazine had a heading on the cover of its post-fight edition telling readers not to buy the issue if they really believed "The Fight" was a draw.

Whitaker continued on to dominate for the next few years, defending his welterweight title against Santos Cardona 0n April 9, 1994 and in a rematch against McGirt on October 1, 1994.

WBA super welterweight champion

In his next fight on March 4, 1995, Whitaker added Julio César Vásquez's WBA super welterweight title to his collection. Early on, Vasquez was the aggressor, and scored a flash knockdown on Whitaker in the 4th round; but Whitaker settled in & used his accuracy and defense to take over and outpoint Vasquez en route to a unanimous decision win. This was a history making fight for Whitaker, as he became only the fourth fighter in history - joining Thomas Hearns, Sugar Ray Leonard, and Roberto Durán - to have won a legitimate world title in four different weight classes. However, he chose to move back to welterweight.

Return to welterweight

Whitaker successfully defended his WBC belt against Scotland's Gary Jacobs on August 26, 1995. In January, 1997, Whitaker put his title on the line against Cuban fighter Diosbelys Hurtado. Hurtado gave Whitaker all he could handle and then some. Hurtado had Whitaker down on all the judges scorecards going into the 11th round: Hurtado scored flash knockdowns against Whitaker in rounds 1 and 6, and Whitaker had a point deducted in the 9th round for hitting Hurtado behind the head. But midway in the 11th round, Whitaker landed a left hook that hurt Hurtado and, in a rare display of aggression and power, unleashed a barrage of left-handed power shots, pummeling Hurtado into the ropes, knocking Hurtado out and almost completely out of the ring before referee Arthur Mercante Jr. stopped the fight at the 1:52 mark, giving Whitaker the come-from-behind TKO win. The win set up a showdown with undefeated 1992 Olympic gold medalist Oscar De La Hoya.

Whitaker vs. De La Hoya

He met Oscar De La Hoya on April 12, 1997, in Las Vegas, Nevada. Whitaker, defending his WBC championship and the mythical status as the best boxer in the world, pound for pound, succeeded in making De La Hoya look bad through his crafty defense, but he was unable to mount a sufficient offense to convince the judges. Whitaker was awarded an official knockdown in the 9th round and, according to CompuBox stats, outlanded De La Hoya in overall punches and connect percentage, using the jab as his primary weapon; but De La Hoya threw and landed almost twice as many power punches and had a slightly higher power punch connect percentage than Whitaker and showed more agression in the fight, which may have been the key factors in De La Hoya winning by a disputed unanimous decision. At the end of the fight, the judges' scores were 111-115, 110-116, 110-116. The fight was much closer than what the scorecards showed, and many observers felt that Whitaker won the fight. It was another controversial decision against Whitaker, but it wasn't seen as a blatant robbery like the Ramirez or Chavez decisions.

For his part, De La Hoya wasn't too pleased with his own performance against Whitaker and had hinted at a possible rematch to prove that he could do better against him. But Bob Arum, De La Hoya's promoter at that time, decided against it.

Whitaker's next bout was against Russian-born fighter Andrey Pestryayev in a world title elimination fight, where the winner would earn an automatic #1 contender spot for the WBA Welterweight crown, held at the time by Ike Quartey. Whitaker originally won the fight, but the win was nullified & changed to a No Decision after he failed a post-fight drug test. Whitaker was suspended for six months, but the commission lifted the suspension after he agreed to random testing and his title bout with Quartey was to proceed as scheduled, however, the bout was cancelled after Whitaker tested positive for a second time.

Whitaker vs. Trinidad
On February 20, 1999, Whitaker suffered his first convincing defeat against the much bigger, much fresher Félix Trinidad, gamely taking the Puerto Rican the distance in an attempt to win Trinidad's IBF welterweight title. The fight began with both boxers displaying aggressive styles, which included excessive pushing. In the following rounds, both boxers used their jabs most of the time, with Trinidad gaining an advantage when Whitaker attempted to attack inside, eventually scoring a knockdown in round two. In the fourth, fifth and sixth rounds the fighters exchanged combinations. Later in the fight, both boxers fell to the canvas in what were ruled as "accidental slips." In the seventh round, Whitaker displayed more offense, trading power punches with Trinidad, but the champion retained control of the fight's tempo during the eight, ninth and tenth rounds. In the last round, Whitaker, with a badly swollen right eye, displayed a purely defensive stance, avoiding his opponent throughout the round while Trinidad continued on the offensive until the fight concluded. The judges gave the champion scores of 117–111, 118–109 and 118–109.

His last fight came on April 27, 2001, against journeyman Carlos Bojorquez. Whitaker, the former lightweight, entered the ring at 155 pounds. He broke his clavicle in round four and was forced to retire; at the time of the stoppage Whitaker was trailing in all the judges' scorecards by 28-29. Following this fight, Whitaker officially announced his retirement. He finished his professional career with an official record of 40-4-1 (17 knockouts).

In 2002, The Ring ranked Whitaker as the 10th Greatest Fighter of the Last 80 Years.

On December 7, 2006, Whitaker was inducted in the International Boxing Hall of Fame along with contemporaries Roberto Durán and Ricardo López. They were all elected in their first year of eligibility.

Boxing style
A southpaw, Whitaker was known for his outstanding defensive skills and for being a strong counterpuncher. He was not a particularly hard puncher or knockout artist, but applied a consistent offense while being extremely elusive and difficult for his opponents to hit with a solid punch.

Career as a trainer
In December 2005 Whitaker became a boxing trainer in his home state of Virginia. While the decline of speed and agility pushed him into retirement, his knowledge of the ring and competitive boxing's components led him to seek out up-and-coming boxers to train to fight in the manner in which he did.

His first fighter, Dorin Spivey fought matches in 2006. He later trained young prospect Joel Julio.

Whitaker was also the trainer for heavyweight Calvin Brock who, as recently as November 2006, fought for the IBF and IBO titles against Wladimir Klitschko, wherein Brock was knocked out in the 7th round.

Whitaker also trained former IBF world champion Paul Spadafora between 2009 and 2010 for 3 fights in which Spadafora won all three.

In 2010, Whitaker was inducted into the Hampton Roads Sports Hall of Fame, honoring those who have contributed to sports in southeastern Virginia.

Whitaker also became the head trainer of former undisputed welterweight champion Zab Judah, who defeated Kaizer Mabuza in March 2011 to win the vacant IBF light welterweight title.

Personal life
Pernell Whitaker was born in Norfolk, Virginia on January 2, 1964, the son of Raymond Whitaker Sr. and his wife, Novella. He had six siblings, two brothers, Raymond Whitaker, Jr, Raynell Whitaker; and four sisters; Zelda Brown, Sylvonia Whitaker, Lucinda Manley, and Monique Williams. He passed away on Sunday, July 14, 2019. 

Pernell married Rovanda Anthony on December 21, 1985 in the boxing ring at the Virginia Beach Pavilion Convention Center. The couple later divorced. They had four children together: Dominique, the late Pernell Jr., Dantavious, and Devon. Pernell also had a daughter, Tiara, from a prior relationship.

Pernell graduated from Booker T. Washington High School in 1982 and later received an honorary Bachelor's degree from Norfolk State University. His humble beginnings started in Youngs Park Housing Community where he was inspired to start his boxing career. Outside of the ring, Sweet Pea served his community and the youth in everything that he did. He sponsored many events at Norfolk State University and spent countless hours training youth at boxing camps and gyms. He also remained active in Norfolk and spoke at city council meetings on behalf of the residents in support of community improvements. 

Pernell had personal struggles and in June 2002 was convicted of cocaine possession after a judge found he violated the terms of a previous sentence by overdosing on cocaine in March. In February 2014, Pernell made national headlines after he evicted his mother, Novella Whitaker, out of the house he purchased for her shortly after he turned pro. Apparently, back taxes were owed on the house and Pernell said that neither his mother nor his siblings, who also stayed in the house, were doing anything to help keep the house afloat financially. Pernell's lawyers said that he is not making the same kind of money as a trainer that he was as a boxer, and needed to sell off the home to satisfy the tax debt owed in order to prevent the property from being seized and put into foreclosure. Outside of the Virginia courtroom where the eviction proceedings took place, he called the ruling in his favor "a beautiful moment."

Death 
At about 10 p.m. on July 14, 2019, Whitaker was crossing the street in Virginia Beach, at the intersection of Northampton Boulevard and Baker Road, when he was struck and killed by a vehicle. He was 55. An autopsy stated that the cause of Whitaker's death was "multiple blunt force trauma."

Professional boxing record

Pay-per-view bouts

See also
List of WBA world champions
List of WBC world champions
List of boxing quadruple champions
List of left-handed boxers

References

External links

Amateur record (incomplete)
R.I.P. Pernell ‘Sweet Pea’ Whitaker, One of the All-Time Greats

 

1964 births
2019 deaths
African-American boxers
American sportspeople in doping cases
Doping cases in boxing
Olympic boxers of the United States
Boxers at the 1984 Summer Olympics
World Boxing Association champions
World Boxing Council champions
International Boxing Federation champions
Southpaw boxers
Pan American Games gold medalists for the United States
Boxers at the 1983 Pan American Games
Olympic gold medalists for the United States in boxing
International Boxing Hall of Fame inductees
Winners of the United States Championship for amateur boxers
Boxers from Virginia
Medalists at the 1984 Summer Olympics
Sportspeople from Norfolk, Virginia
American male boxers
AIBA World Boxing Championships medalists
The Ring (magazine) champions
World lightweight boxing champions
World light-welterweight boxing champions
World welterweight boxing champions
World light-middleweight boxing champions
Pan American Games medalists in boxing
Road incident deaths in Virginia
Pedestrian road incident deaths
Medalists at the 1983 Pan American Games